Blanche Eleanor Carnachan  (23 November 1871 – 22 March 1954) was a New Zealand teacher, educationalist and community worker. She was born in Cambridge, New Zealand, on 23 November 1871.

In 1935, she was awarded the King George V Silver Jubilee Medal. In the 1939 King's Birthday Honours, Carnachan was appointed a Member of the Order of the British Empire, for social welfare services.

References

1871 births
1954 deaths
New Zealand educators
New Zealand social workers
New Zealand women academics
People from Cambridge, New Zealand
New Zealand Members of the Order of the British Empire
New Zealand justices of the peace